Limacia iberica, is a sea slug, a species of dorid nudibranch. It is a marine gastropod mollusc in the family Polyceridae.

Description
The length of the species attains 9 mm.

Distribution
Limacia iberica was described from Shelf “O Sobreiro”,  in the Ría de Arousa, Galicia, Atlantic cast of Spain.

References

Polyceridae
Gastropods described in 2015